Amer Zahr (born 1977) a Palestinian-American comedian and political activist.

Early life
Zahr was born in Lebanon to refugee parents of Palestinian heritage originally from Acre, and then moved to the United States when he was three years old. His father is Christian and his mother is Muslim, and he was raised with both traditions in the Philadelphia area.

Career
In 2013, Zahr founded the "1001 Laughs Dearborn Comedy Festival," which continues annually. He wrote "Being a Palestinian Makes Me Smile" and made the documentary We’re Not White, which was released in August 2017.

In 2016, Zahr served a national surrogate for presidential candidate Bernie Sanders.

Personal life
Zahr lives, and is based in, Dearborn, Michigan. He is an adjunct professor at the University of Detroit Mercy School of Law.

References

External links

 

Living people
American stand-up comedians
American comedians of Arab descent
American people of Palestinian descent
Comedians from Michigan
University of Detroit Mercy faculty
Jordanian emigrants to the United States
1977 births
21st-century American comedians